The Norwood Junction railway crash occurred on 1 May 1891, when a cast-iron underbridge over Portland Road,  north-east of Norwood Junction railway station, fractured under the weight of an express train from Brighton to London Bridge.

The locomotive, no. 175 "Hayling" crossed the bridge safely with most of its carriages, but the brake van fell into the gap on the bridge. There were no serious casualties: a passenger suffered a dislocated ankle; four further passengers were slightly injured and the guard in the foremost brake van received head and arm injuries.  The accident drew attention to the weakness of cast-iron structures in underbridges, especially as many had been installed in the 1830s and 1840s when locomotives and carriages were much lighter.

Causes
The bridge belonged to the London Brighton and South Coast Railway and had been reconstructed in 1859. The Board of Trade investigation was carried out by General Hutchinson, who had investigated a similar bridge failure at Carlisle in 1875.  He found that the single girder that cracked was seriously flawed with a very large hidden casting defect in the flange and web. Even if perfect, the girder design did not meet current Board of Trade requirements for safety margins on cast-iron girder underbridges, and this was already known from a previous accident.
The attention of the Brighton Company was drawn by the Board of Trade to this deficiency of strength after ... the accident on this bridge in December 1876 when two identical girders at a different part of the same bridge were broken by an engine getting off the rails, and they were then recommended to substitute stronger girders in their place, a recommendation to which unfortunately no attention was paid, or the present serious accident would have been prevented; the Brighton Company is therefore, in my opinion, deserving of much blame for having omitted to substitute stronger girders for the existing ones after attention had been thus specially directed to the weakness of the latter
A cast-iron rail bridge girder had fractured under a passing train at Inverythan in Scotland in 1882, with five passengers killed and many more injured. The Board of Trade investigation report on the Inverythan accident had commented on the problem of latent defects, but had concentrated attention in the first instance on composite girders, bolted together mid-span, and those of over  span. (The failed girder in the Carlisle incident was non-composite, with a  span and had a major hidden casting defect. It had been built before the 1847 Dee bridge disaster and the consequent specification by the Board of Trade of required wide safety margins on cast-iron structures; even if perfect it would have not have met them. The bridge had been rebuilt with wrought-iron girders and the failure had not triggered any wider survey of cast-iron bridges.)   

General Hutchinson recommended that all cast-iron girder bridges on the LB&SCR network be inspected. The task fell to Sir John Fowler, who recommended that many be replaced by wrought iron (or preferably steel) structures, commenting that the result of my investigation does not indicate any peculiar weakness in the Brighton bridges which are neither better nor worse in that respect than those on similar lines of railway at home or abroad
The accident led the Board of Trade to issue a circular requesting details of all cast-iron underbridges on the UK network. There were thousands of them, and most were gradually replaced, but as of 2007 Network Rail stated that there are still many hundreds of cast-iron beam overbridges remaining, many with very low weight restrictions.

References

External links
Description of accident with photographs
Punch article and cartoon illustrating contemporaneous concern at structurally unsound bridges

Railway accidents and incidents in London
Railway accidents in 1891
1891 in England
History of the London Borough of Croydon
Disasters in Surrey
Bridge disasters in the United Kingdom
Bridge disasters caused by engineering error
Bridge disasters caused by construction error
Accidents and incidents involving London, Brighton and South Coast Railway
May 1891 events
19th century in Surrey
1891 disasters in the United Kingdom